Switchblade Serenades is the second studio album by Swedish heavy metal band Sister Sin. The album was released through Victory Records in 2008.

Reception
AllMusic writer Eric Schneider states, "Drawing inspiration from early Motley Crue and W.A.S.P., the Gothenburg-based ensemble specializes in unabashedly retro-minded metal with vocalist Liv coming across as a female version of Vince Neil, particularly on the scrappy "Make My Day.""

Track listing

Personnel
 Liv Jagrell – vocals
 Jimmy Hiltula – guitar, backing vocals
 Chris – bass
 Dave Sundberg – drums

References

2008 albums
Sister Sin albums
Victory Records albums